Ramsey County is a county located in the U.S. state of Minnesota. As of the 2020 census, the population was 552,352, making it the second-most populous county in Minnesota. Its county seat and largest city is Saint Paul, the state capital and the twin city of Minneapolis. The county was founded in 1849 and is named for Alexander Ramsey, the first governor of the Minnesota Territory.

Ramsey County is included in the Minneapolis–Saint Paul-Bloomington, MN-WI Metropolitan Statistical Area. It is the smallest and most densely populated county in Minnesota, as well as one of the most densely populated counties in the United States.

History
With the establishment of the Minnesota Territory in 1849, nine counties, including Ramsey County, were created. In 1849, Ramsey County included all of what later became the present-day counties of Ramsey, Anoka, Isanti, and Kanabec; and part of Washington, Pine, Carlton, Aitkin, Mille Lacs, and Hennepin. One of Ramsey County's early settlers was Heman Gibbs, whose farm is now operated as the Gibbs Museum of Pioneer and Dakotah Life (Gibbs Farm) in Falcon Heights. Ramsey County remained largely farmland until small villages began to appear in the late 19th century, with the incorporation of North St. Paul in 1887, New Brighton in 1891, and White Bear Lake in 1921.

Government and politics
Ramsey County is overwhelmingly Democratic in presidential elections, having not voted for a Republican presidential candidate since 1924. In 2020, Democratic nominee Joe Biden received the largest share of the vote for any candidate in the county's history, with over 71%.

County Sheriff
The Ramsey County Sheriff's Office was established in the old Minnesota Territory in 1849. The current sheriff is Bob Fletcher, who won the general election for Ramsey County Sheriff on November 6, 2018. The Ramsey County Sheriff is elected for a four-year term via an election running concurrent with the federal mid-term elections.

The sheriff's office provides patrol and investigation for communities without local police forces and is available as backup for all communities. In addition to enforcing the law throughout the county, the office provides town police services under contract to Arden Hills, Falcon Heights, Little Canada, North Oaks, Shoreview,  Vadnais Heights and White Bear Township.

The Ramsey County Sheriff's office provides a number of unique services across the county as mandated by law. This includes detention for court and other court services. This also includes safety, rescue and law enforcement on the waterways. Proactively, the Sheriff's office provides multiple safety classes and coordinates community volunteer efforts. The office is responsible for the county jail, more officially the "Adult Detention Center." The facility has a capacity of five hundred prisoners and a staff of about 150.

On August 25, 2022, Ramsey County Sheriff Bob Fletcher announced that the Sheriff's office would be featured on the show On Patrol: Live, airing on Reelz. However an agreement was not reached, Sheriff Bob Fletcher continues a broadcast of many of his and his deputies shifts.

County Attorney
The Ramsey County Attorney prosecutes felony crimes which are committed within the jurisdiction of Ramsey County. The current County Attorney is John Choi, who was elected in 2010.

County Commissioners
The county commission elects a chair who presides at meetings.
Commissioners as of January 3, 2023:

Geography
It is the smallest county by area in Minnesota. It has been considered completely urbanized since the 1990 United States Census.

Adjacent counties
 Anoka County (north)
 Washington County (east)
 Dakota County (south)
 Hennepin County (west)

National protected area
 Mississippi National River and Recreation Area (part)

Transportation

Rail
Ramsey County is a major freight hub along BNSF's Northern Transcon route, as well as being served by Union Pacific and Canadian Pacific.

Amtrak offers daily intercity passenger rail service on the Empire Builder from Union Depot in Saint Paul. Light rail service is provided by Metro, a light rail and bus rapid transit system operated by Metro Transit that connects several communities in Ramsey and Hennepin Counties. The Metro Green Line connects St. Paul Union Depot to Target Field station in Minneapolis, in neighboring Hennepin County.

Road 
Ramsey County is served by several interstate highways, including Interstate 35 and Interstate 94. I-35 has two routes through Ramsey County. I-35E enters the county from Dakota County to the south and proceeds north through Saint Paul, where it intersects I-94, then continues north to Little Canada, where it runs east concurrently with I-694 for several miles before turning north through North Oaks to Washington County. I-35W crosses from Minneapolis to the west through Saint Anthony before turning north through New Brighton, where it intersects I-694, and then to Anoka County where it goes on to rejoin I-35E in Washington County.

Near the western edge of the county, I-94 enters from Minneapolis where it runs almost parallel to University Avenue until it meets I-35E in Saint Paul and continues east to Washington County. I-494 passes through the southeast corner of the county between Dakota and Washington Counties. From Anoka County in the west, I-694 takes a path through New Brighton, where it meets I-35W, to the junction with I-35E in Little Canada and finally to Washington County in the east.

Ramsey County is also accessible by several U.S. Highways, in particular US 10, US 52, and US 61. US 10 enters from Washington County in the south and continues north to meet I-94 just east of Saint Paul where it turns west to run concurrently with I-94, I-35E, I-694, and finally I-35W before continuing northwest to Anoka County. US 52 runs from South Saint Paul in Dakota County north to downtown Saint Paul where it meets I-94 and turns west to run concurrently with it all the way to the North Dakota border. From the south, US 61 runs concurrently with US 10 and then I-94 until it continues northeast on surface streets through the East Side of Saint Paul. From Saint Paul, US 61 continues north through Maplewood and White Bear Lake before crossing the border into Washington County.

In addition to these federal highways, Ramsey County is served by a number of Minnesota State Highways, including MN 36 and MN 51 which are divided highways for much of their length.

The county also has jurisdiction over 264.108 miles of County State Aid Highways as well as 21,031 miles of county roads and 59 bridges that are maintained and monitored by the Public Works Department of Ramsey County.

Major highways

  Interstate 35E
  Interstate 35W
  Interstate 94
  Interstate 694
  U.S. Highway 10
  U.S. Highway 12
  U.S. Highway 52
  U.S. Highway 61
  Minnesota State Highway 5
  Minnesota State Highway 13
  Minnesota State Highway 36
  Minnesota State Highway 51
  Minnesota State Highway 96
  Minnesota State Highway 120
  Minnesota State Highway 149
  Minnesota State Highway 156
  Minnesota State Highway 280
  County Road 30 (Larpenteur Avenue)
  County Road 34 (University Avenue)
   County Road 36/37 (Shepard Road/Warner Road)
 Other county roads

Air
The primary airport serving Ramsey County is Minneapolis–Saint Paul International Airport, located in neighboring Hennepin County. The only airport located in Ramsey County is Saint Paul Downtown Airport, a smaller commercial airport with three runways primarily used for general aviation and military operations.

Demographics

2020 census

Note: the US Census treats Hispanic/Latino as an ethnic category. This table excludes Latinos from the racial categories and assigns them to a separate category. Hispanics/Latinos can be of any race.

2010
As of the 2010 Census, there were 508,640 people, 202,691 households, and 117,799 families living in the county. The racial makeup of the county was 70.1% White, 11.0% Black or African American, 0.8% Native American, 11.7% Asian, 2.9% from other races, and 3.5% from two or more races. 7.2% of the population were Hispanic or Latino of any race.

According to the 2010–2015 American Community Survey, the largest ancestry groups were was German (26.0%), Irish (11.5%), Norwegian (9.9%), and Swedish (7.4%).

2000
At the 2000 Census, there were 511,035 people, 201,236 households, and 119,936 families living in the county. The racial makeup of the county was 77.37% White, 7.61% Black or African American, 0.83% Native American, 8.77% Asian, 0.06% Pacific Islander, 2.45% from other races, and 2.90% from two or more races. 5.28% of the population were Hispanic or Latino of any race.

There were 201,236 households, out of which 29.80% had children under the age of 18 living with them, 44.00% were married couples living together, 11.90% had a female householder with no husband present, and 40.40% were non-families. 32.00% of all households were made up of individuals, and 9.50% had someone living alone who was 65 years of age or older. The average household size was 2.45 and the average family size was 3.16.

In the county, 25.60% of the population was under the age of 18, 11.30% from 18 to 24, 30.70% from 25 to 44, 20.70% from 45 to 64, and 11.60% was 65 years of age or older. The median age was 34 years. For every 100 females there were 93.00 males. For every 100 females age 18 and over, there were 89.20 males.

The median income for a household in the county was $45,722, and the median income for a family was $57,747. (These figures had risen to $53,141 and $71,485, respectively, as of 2008.)  Males had a median income of $39,806 versus $30,814 for females. The per capita income for the county was $23,536. About 7.40% of families and 10.60% of the population were below the poverty line, including 15.70% of those under age 18 and 6.80% of those age 65 or over.

Communities

Cities
 Arden Hills
 Blaine (partial)
 Falcon Heights
 Gem Lake
 Lauderdale
 Little Canada
 Maplewood
 Mounds View
 New Brighton
 North Oaks
 North St. Paul
 Roseville
 Saint Paul (county seat)
 Shoreview
 Spring Lake Park (partial)
 St. Anthony (partial)
 Vadnais Heights
 White Bear Lake (partial)

Township
 White Bear Township

Unincorporated communities
 Bald Eagle
 Bellaire

Education
School districts include:
 Mounds View Public School District
 North St. Paul-Maplewood-Oakdale School District
 Roseville Public School District
 St. Anthony-New Brighton Schools
 St. Paul Public School District
 White Bear Lake School District

Charter schools include:
 Hmong College Prep Academy
 Metro Deaf School

See also
 Ramsey County Library
 National Register of Historic Places listings in Ramsey County, Minnesota

References

External links
 Ramsey County government website
 Ramsey County Historical Society

 
Minneapolis–Saint Paul
Minnesota counties on the Mississippi River
1849 establishments in Minnesota Territory
Populated places established in 1849